Kaldi or Khalid was a legendary Arab Ethiopian goatherd who discovered the coffee plant around 850 CE, according to popular legend, show some artwork depicting him, after which it entered the Islamic world and then the rest of the world.

Story
In the 9th century a goat herder named Kaldi from Kaffa noticed that when his goats were nibbling on the bright red berries of a certain bush, they became very energetic, Kaldi then chewed on the fruit himself. His exhilaration prompted him to bring the berries to the nearest place of worship in the village. After a brief explanation, the head monk deemed the berries to be the "Devil’s work", and abruptly threw the berries into a nearby fire. Soon thereafter, a sensual and powerful aroma filled the room that could not be overlooked. The head monk, who had thrown them in the fire in the first place, ordered the embers be pulled from the fire and for hot water to be poured over them to preserve the smell. Upon drinking the mixture, they experienced the peaceful, warming, and calming sensation it gave them. The after-effects were just as powerful, as they were able to stay alert and discuss important matters for longer periods of time. The monk then shared his discovery with the other monks at the monastery, and knowledge of the energizing berries began to spread.

Analysis
The story is probably apocryphal, as it was first related by Antoine Faustus Nairon, a Maronite Roman professor of Oriental languages and author of one of the first printed treatises devoted to coffee, De Saluberrima potione Cahue seu Cafe nuncupata Discurscus (Rome, 1671).

Influence
In modern times, "Kaldi Coffee" or "Kaldi's Coffee" and "Dancing Goat" or "Wandering Goat" are popular names for coffee shops and coffee roasting companies around the world. The biggest coffee chain in Ethiopia is called Kaldi's.

References

Further reading
All about coffee from Google books
All about coffee from archive.org

Legendary Islamic people
History of coffee